Dhruva Thare is a 1985 Indian Kannada-language film directed by M. S. Rajashekar. The film stars Rajkumar, Geetha and Deepa. The movie is famous for its songs  composed by Upendra Kumar. It is based on the novel Aparanji written by Vijay Sasanur.

Plot
Sagar is a well-known city lawyer who is on the side of truth all the time. He falls in love with Sudha, a college student and marries her. He develops his inner talent of painting and goes commercial with it. A grave disaster strikes his family, which later becomes a legal case. Whether he remains a painter and lets go of the case or fights for the truth forms the rest of the story.

Cast
 Rajkumar as Sagar
 Geetha as Sudha
 Deepa as Sarala
 Thoogudeepa Srinivas as Pavan Kumar
 Balakrishna as Kalinga Rai
 Shivaram as Shivarama Rai
 Shankar Bhat
 Ashwath Narayan 
 Rajanand as Vishwanatha Rai
 Sadashiva Brahmavar as Sudha's father

Soundtrack

Awards
Karnataka State Film Awards
 Second Best Film
 Best Story — Vijay Sasanur
 Best Cinematographer — B. C. Gowrishankar

References

External links 
 Dhruva Thare at Raaga

External Source

1985 films
1980s Kannada-language films
Films based on Indian novels
Films directed by M. S. Rajashekar
Indian drama films
Indian legal films
Films with screenplays by Chi. Udayashankar
1985 directorial debut films